The 1985 Trofeo Filippo Caracciolo was the second round of the 1985 World Endurance Championship.  It took place at the Autodromo Nazionale Monza, Italy on April 28, 1985.

Although scheduled for 173 laps (1000 km), the race was stopped after 138 laps due to a tree falling and blocking the circuit.

Official results
Class winners in bold.  Cars failing to complete 75% of the winner's distance marked as Not Classified (NC).

† - #18 Brun Motorsport was disqualified for having refueled the car during a pit stop quicker than the regulations allowed.

Statistics
 Pole Position - #4 Martini Racing - 1:31.00
 Fastest Lap - #4 Martini Racing - 1:40.04
 Average Speed - 196.264 km/h

References

 

Monza
Monza
6 Hours of Monza